Bang Bang Baby is a Canadian musical science-fiction film written and directed by Jeffrey St. Jules, which premiered in 2014 at Toronto International Film Festival.

Plot
Stepphy, a teenager living in the small town of Lonely Arms, dreams of becoming a famous singer.  Her alcoholic father, George, refuses to let her enter a singing competition in New York City. She believes that her fate may change when her idol, Bobby Shore, shows up in town after his car breaks down. Meanwhile, a dangerous leak at the local chemical plant is beginning to turn the local townsfolk into mutants.

Cast

Production
In March 2014, it was announced Jane Levy, Justin Chatwin and Peter Stormare will star in the film, with Jeffrey St. Jules directing from a screenplay he wrote. Principal photography began on February 12, 2014 in Toronto.

Awards
The film won the award for Best Canadian First Feature Film at the 2014 Toronto International Film Festival, and was named the winner of the 2014 Claude Jutra Award. The TIFF jury remarked, "For its ingenious mixing of genres, sophisticated blend of tones and ability to create its own strange, tragicomic and original world without sacrificing any richness in regards to story, character and emotion, the jury recognizes as Best Canadian First Feature Film Bang Bang Baby by Jeffrey St. Jules." The award carries a cash prize of $15,000.

The film garnered two Canadian Screen Award nominations at the 3rd Canadian Screen Awards, for Best Supporting Actor (Chatwin) and Best Overall Sound (Christopher Guglick, Dave Mercel, Steve Moore, Justin Sawyer and Alex Turner).

Release
Bang Bang Baby premiered in 2014 at the Toronto International Film Festival on September 8. The film was also screened at Santa Barbara International Film Festival on February 5, 2015 and Omaha Film Festival on March 11. The film opened in select theaters in Canada on August 21, 2015 distributed by Search Engine Films. On November 10, 2015 the film was released in U.S through video on demand by Random Media.

Critical reception
Bang Bang Baby received mixed reviews from critics. On Rotten Tomatoes the film has a rating of 67%, based on 9 reviews, with an average rating of 6.6/10. Bruce Demara of Toronto Star gave the film a negative review writing: "St. Jules clearly has talent. What he needs is a story that maintains its consistent level of zany wit from beginning to end.". Glenn Sumi of Now Toronto, on the other hand, gave the film a positive review writing: "St. Jules's script takes too many detours, and many plot points aren't carried through. Sometimes the meta film jokes feel strained. But he gets strong performances from the cast, who all channel 60s archetypes while maintaining their individuality."

References

External links

Bang Bang Baby at Library and Archives Canada

2014 films
2010s science fiction films
2010s musical films
Canadian musical comedy films
Canadian science fiction comedy films
English-language Canadian films
Best First Feature Genie and Canadian Screen Award-winning films
Films directed by Jeffrey St. Jules
2014 directorial debut films
Science fiction musical films
2010s English-language films
2010s Canadian films
Canadian pregnancy films